Frankfurt-Berkersheim station is a railway station in the Berkersheim district of Frankfurt, Germany.

References

Rhine-Main S-Bahn stations
Railway stations in Frankfurt